Gallantry may refer to:
 military courage or bravery
 Chivalry 
 Warrior ethos
 Knightly Piety
 Proper behaviour in upper-class social environments, especially during the early modern period, see courtly manner, adoration, gracious hospitality, Courtesy, pious and courtly love
 Gallantry (opera), a one-act opera by composer Douglas Moore

See also

Gallant (disambiguation)